Stacey Elizabeth Plaskett (born May 13, 1966) is an American politician, attorney, and commentator. She is a non-voting delegate to the United States House of Representatives from the United States Virgin Islands' (USVI) at-large congressional district, since 2015. Plaskett has practiced law in New York City, Washington, D.C., and the U.S. Virgin Islands.

Prior to 2008, Plaskett was a member of the Republican Party, and was appointed by President George W. Bush to serve in the Civil Division of the United States Department of Justice. She switched to the Democratic Party in late 2008 because she believed it was a better place to have new ideas heard. She served as a House manager during the second impeachment trial of Donald Trump, the first non-voting member of the House of Representatives to do so.

Early life and education
Plaskett was born on May 13, 1966, in Brooklyn, New York and grew up in the Bushwick housing projects. Her parents are both from Saint Croix, U.S. Virgin Islands; Her father was a New York City Police Department officer and her mother a clerk in the court system. Her family regularly traveled to Saint Croix during her childhood, so she became familiar with island traditions and culture. Her parents' home in New York was often home for students and other recent migrants moving to the mainland from the Virgin Islands. She attended Brooklyn Friends School (a Quaker school) and Grace Lutheran Elementary. She was recruited by A Better Chance, Inc. a non-profit organization recruiting minority students to selective secondary schools. She was a boarding student at Choate Rosemary Hall, where she was a varsity athlete and served as class president for several years.

Plaskett spent a term abroad in France during her enrollment at Choate. She often states that Choate awakened her commitment to public service and a deep sense of responsibility to others through the biblical verse "to whom much is given; much is required". She was one of few black students while she attended the school. In 1988, she graduated with a degree in history and diplomacy from the Edmund A. Walsh School of Foreign Service at Georgetown University.

Plaskett ran for student government at Georgetown under a progressive student ticket and was very active in the Anti-Apartheid Movement. As a student she spoke on behalf of universities in the DC area at the General Assembly of the United Nations. She received herJ.D. degree from the American University Washington College of Law in 1994. She attended law school at night while she worked full-time during the day with the lobbying arm of the American Medical Association and then with the law firm, Jones Day. In law school she studied constitutional law under her future colleague, Representative Jamie Raskin of Maryland.

Career
After graduating from law school, Plaskett accepted a position as a assistant district attorney in the Bronx, New York, under Robert T. Johnson. She prosecuted several hundred cases, including in the Narcotics Bureau. She then worked as a consultant and legal counsel focused on internal corporate investigations and strategy for the Mitchell Madison Group. She moved to Washington, D.C., and worked as counsel on the Republican-led US House of Representatives, Committee on Standards of Official Conduct; now known as the House Committee on Ethics or simply the Ethics Committee. She left the Committee when she was asked by mentor and fellow trustee at Choate, Robert McCallum to work at the United States Department of Justice as a political appointee of then-President George W. Bush.

Plaskett accepted the offer and served as counsel for the assistant attorney general for the DOJ Civil Division, and also as acting deputy assistant attorney general for the Torts Branch in the Civil Division. She then joined the staff of Deputy Attorney General Larry Thompson, primarily working on the Justice Honors program and an initiative to increase the number of minority and women attorneys at the Justice Department. While in the Justice Civil Division, she also worked on the Terrorism Litigation Task Force, the September 11th Victim Compensation Fund and United States v. Philip Morris, the case against several major tobacco companies for violations of the Racketeer Influenced and Corrupt Organizations Act (RICO) by engaging in a conspiracy to deceive the public about the health effects of smoking.

After Larry Thompson resigned, Plaskett joined the staff of his successor James Comey. She later left government service to become a deputy general counsel at UnitedHealth Group. There, she worked in the Americhoice division, handling legal work related to Medicaid and Medicare programs. She then moved to the Virgin Islands, where she worked in private practice and from 2007 to 2014 served as general counsel for the Virgin Islands Economic Development Authority, charged with the economic development of the U.S. territory.

Plaskett switched from the Republican Party to the Democratic Party in late-2008. She was initiated into Delta Sigma Theta sorority in 2019.

U.S. House of Representatives

Elections

2012

In 2012, Plaskett challenged nine-term delegate Donna Christian-Christensen in the Democratic Party primary. Plaskett was unsuccessful, receiving 42.49% of the vote to Christian-Christensen's 57.48%.

2014

In 2014, Plaskett ran for the office again, after formally declaring her candidacy in November 2013. In the Democratic Primary held on August 2, she faced Shawn-Micheal Malone, a Virgin Islands Senator, and Senate President, and Emmett Hansen, a former Virgin Islands Senator and former chair of the Democratic Party of the Virgin Islands. She received 50.4% of the vote to Malone's 41.61% and Hansen's 7.92%. She later faced Republican Vince Danet in the General Election held on November 4. She received over 90% of the vote.

2016

Plaskett was challenged in the Democratic Party Primary by former Virgin Islands Senator Ronald Russell. She defeated Russell in the primary with 85.48% of the vote to his 14.04%. In the general election, she faced Republican Gordon Ackley, an Air Force veteran and business owner, who ran as a write-in candidate. She won the election in a landslide, garnering almost 98% of the vote.

2018

Plaskett won re-election unopposed in both the Democratic primary and the general election.

2020

Plaskett won re-election, defeating independent candidate Shekema George with 88.09% of the vote.

Impeachment manager
On January 12, 2021, Plaskett was named as a House impeachment manager for the second impeachment of Donald Trump in response to the storming of the United States Capitol on January 6, 2021. During the trial on February 10, 2021, she was introduced by lead impeachment manager Jamie Raskin of Maryland, her former constitutional law professor, who said she was "an 'A' student then and she is an 'A+' student now".

Weaponization Subcommittee
On February 2, 2023, Plaskett was appointed by Minority Leader Hakeem Jeffries as the Ranking Member of the United States House Judiciary Select Subcommittee on the Weaponization of the Federal Government.  Plaskett has criticized multiple decisions made by the Republican Majority, stating in her opening statement of the select subcommittee's first hearing "I'm deeply concerned about the use of the select subcommittee as a place to settle scores, showcase conspiracy theories and advance an extreme agenda that risks undermining Americans' faith in our democracy." 
On March 2, 2023, Plaskett along with Ranking Member Jerrold Nadler released a staff report titled GOP Witnesses: What Their Disclosures Indicate About The State Of The Republican Investigations, in which, they criticized 3 alleged whistleblowers (George Hill, Garret O’Boyle, and Stephen Friend) who had transcribed interviews with the Select Subcommittee. The 3 have been the only ones who have been transcribed out of "dozens and dozens of whistleblowers" who have had previous discussions with House Judiciary Republicans. In the 315 paged report, Subcommittee Democrats doubt the credibility of the 3 whistleblowers, stating that they are heavily MAGA biased and had no evidence of actual FBI misconduct.

Committee assignments
118th Congress
House Permanent Select Committee on Intelligence
Subcommittee on National Intelligence Enterprise (Ranking Member)
Subcommittee on Defense Intelligence and Overhead Architecture
House Judiciary Select Subcommittee on the Weaponization (Ranking Member)

117th Congress
 Committee on Agriculture
 Subcommittee on Biotechnology, Horticulture and Research (Chair)
 Subcommittee on Commodity Exchanges, Energy and Credit
 Subcommittee on Livestock and Foreign Agriculture
 Committee on the Budget
 Committee on Ways and Means
 Subcommittee on Oversight
 Subcommittee on Select Revenue Measures

Past memberships
 Committee on Agriculture
 Subcommittee on Nutrition
 Subcommittee on Livestock and Foreign Agriculture
 Committee on Oversight and Government Reform
 Subcommittee on Government Operations
 Subcommittee on Interior

Caucus memberships
New Democrat Coalition (Leadership Member)
 Congressional Black Caucus
Climate Solutions Caucus

Personal life
Plaskett is married to Jonathan Buckney Small, a community activist and former professional tennis player. She has five children, four of them with Andre Duffy, her previous husband. She has served on numerous non-profit boards focused primarily on education, culture, and community development. Plaskett is Lutheran.

See also
List of African-American United States representatives
Women in the United States House of Representatives

References

External links

 Congresswoman Stacey Plaskett official U.S. House website
 Plaskett for Congress campaign website

 

|-

1966 births
21st-century American politicians
21st-century American women politicians
African-American lawyers
African-American members of the United States House of Representatives
African-American people in United States Virgin Island politics
African-American women in politics
African-American women lawyers
American women lawyers
Choate Rosemary Hall alumni
Delegates to the United States House of Representatives from the United States Virgin Islands
Democratic Party members of the United States House of Representatives from the United States Virgin Islands
Democratic Party of the Virgin Islands politicians
Female members of the United States House of Representatives
Georgetown University alumni
Living people
Politicians from Brooklyn
United States Virgin Islands lawyers
United States Virgin Islands women in politics
Washington College of Law alumni
Brooklyn Friends School alumni
People from Bushwick, Brooklyn
American people of United States Virgin Islands descent
21st-century African-American women
21st-century African-American politicians
20th-century African-American people
20th-century African-American women